Vladislav Yurievich Kotlyarsky (born 2 August 1972, Moscow) is a Russian film, television and theatre actor. He is best known for his role as police major Stanislav Karpov in the crime television series Glukhar since 2008.

In 2002 he graduated from the directing department of the GITIS (Andrey Goncharov's course).

Public political views
In 2019, Kotlyarsky condemned the actions of the Moscow police during the Moscow protests, describing them as unnecessarily violent and illegal.

On 24 February 2022, Vladislav spoke out against Russia's military invasion of Ukraine.

Selected filmography
 Children of the Arbat (2004) as episode
 Penal Battalion (2004) as Major Gnedyuk
 Nasha Russia (2008) as representative man (season 3, episode 16) 
 Glukhar (2008–2011) as Stanislav Karpov (95 episodes)
 Forbidden Reality (2009) as Baboon Face's driver
 Interns (2012) as police major
 The Junior Team (2018) as investigator Poryvaev
 The Factory (2018) as prosecutor

Awards and nominations
2013
 APKIT Award: Best Actor in a TV Movie/Series in Karpov (nom)

Personal life
He married actress Victoria Boldyreva (born 1987) in the winter of 2016. Daughters Elina and Nicole.

References

External links

 Vladislav Kotlyarsky at KinoPoisk
 Vladislav Kotlyarsky at kino-teatr.ru

1972 births
Living people
Male actors from Moscow
Russian male film actors
Russian male stage actors
Russian male television actors
20th-century Russian male actors
21st-century Russian male actors
Russian Academy of Theatre Arts alumni
Russian activists against the 2022 Russian invasion of Ukraine